Ivan Petrović (born 5 October 1978) is a Serbian football midfielder who plays for Radnički Kovači. He is a president of Apolon football academy which corresponds as the youth team of OFK Radnički and also based in Kovači.

Club career
Born in Kraljevo, Petrović played with local club Sloga at the beginning of career. Later he played with Partizan, Milicionar and Čukarički until 2004, when he signed with joined OFK Beograd. After he left the club, Petrović moved to Nanjing, where he spent some period playing with local club. Petrović also played with Ethnikos Achna between 2007 and 2011. In summer 2011, he returned to OFK Beograd, where he ended his professional career. After he ended his professional career, Petrović returned to his home town and joined OFK Radnički Kovači.

Petrović is also one of founders of FC Apolon, which organized as an academy of OFK Radnički Kovači. At the beginning of 2016, Petrović was elected as a president of football association of Kraljevo.

In the first half of 2016–17 season, Petrović also made 1 appearance for Radnički Kovači in the Morava Zone League. He was substituted in during the fifth fixture match against Tutin, and later scored a goal from direct free kick for 2–0 victory. He also made 8 appearances for the team in second half-season as the most experienced midfielder in front of Dejan Radosavljević and Milutin Trnavac.

References

External links
 
 Ivan Petrović stats at utakmica.rs 
 

1978 births
Living people
Sportspeople from Kraljevo
Association football midfielders
Serbian footballers
FK Sloga Kraljevo players
FK Milicionar players
FK Čukarički players
OFK Beograd players
Serbian SuperLiga players
Serbian expatriate footballers
Serbian expatriate sportspeople in China
Expatriate footballers in China
Serbian expatriate sportspeople in Cyprus
Expatriate footballers in Cyprus
Ethnikos Achna FC players
Cypriot First Division players
OFK Radnički Kovači players